The Defence and Home Affairs Select Committee (Malay: Jawatankuasa Pilihan Khas Pertahanan dan Hal Ehwal Dalam Negeri; ; Tamil: பாதுகாப்பு மற்றும் உள்நாட்டு விவகாரங்களுக்கான சிறப்புக் குழு மலேசியா) is one of many select committees of the Malaysian House of Representatives, which scrutinises the Ministry of Defence and Ministry of Home Affairs. It is among six new bipartisan parliamentary select committees announced by Speaker of the House of Representatives, Mohamad Ariff Md Yusof, on 4 December 2018 in an effort to improve the institutional system.

Membership

14th Parliament 
As of December 2019, the committee's current members are as follows:

Former members of the committee are as follows:

Chair of the Defence and Home Affairs Select Committee

See also 
 Parliamentary Committees of Malaysia

Notes

References 

Parliament of Malaysia
Committees of the Parliament of Malaysia
Committees of the Dewan Rakyat